Toyelle Wilson (born October 29, 1981) is the head women's basketball coach for Southern Methodist University. She previously served as an assistant coach at Michigan and Baylor. Wilson has also previously served as head coach of Prairie View A&M. 

A native of Voorhees Township, New Jersey, Wilson graduated from Eastern Regional High School. She played basketball for four seasons at Manhattan College, where she graduated in 2003 with a degree in business management.

Coaching career
Wilson began her coaching career at Robert Morris in 2003 as an assistant. She was then hired at Prairie View A&M in 2006 in the same role under head coach and WNBA legend Cynthia Cooper.

Prairie View A&M
After Cooper was named the head coach at UNC Wilmington, Wilson was promoted to head coach. Wilson guided her team to three-consecutive SWAC Tournament Championships and NCAA Tournaments. During her time there, she never encountered a losing season and compiled an overall record of 55–43 with 36–18 in conference play.

Baylor
In 2013, Wilson was hired as an assistant at Baylor. In Wilson's six seasons at Baylor, the Lady Bears were the 2019 national champions, won six regular season Big 12 Conference championship and five conference tournament titles. Baylor also made four NCAA Elite Eight appearances and one NCAA Sweet 16 during her time in Waco.
 
On the recruiting trail, Wilson helped Baylor recruit top-10 recruiting classes every year, including the No. 1 recruiting class in the country in 2018.

Michigan
On May 20, 2019, Wilson was named an assistant coach and recruiting coordinator for the Michigan Wolverines women's basketball team. Wilson worked primarily with the post players, helping Naz Hillmon to her second-straight All-Big Ten first-team nod and WBCA All-America honorable mention and become Big Ten Player of the Year in 2021. On the recruiting trail, Michigan's 2020 recruiting class was ranked as high as No. 12.

SMU
On April 1, 2021, Wilson was named SMU's head coach.

Head coaching record

College

References

External links
Michigan Profile

1981 births
Living people
American women's basketball coaches
Basketball coaches from New Jersey
Basketball players from New Jersey
Baylor Bears women's basketball coaches
Eastern Regional High School alumni
Manhattan College alumni
Michigan Wolverines women's basketball coaches
People from Voorhees Township, New Jersey
Prairie View A&M Lady Panthers basketball coaches
Robert Morris Colonials women's basketball coaches
Sportspeople from Camden County, New Jersey